Dasytes aeratus is a species of soft-winged flower beetle in the family Melyridae. It is found mainly in Europe.

References

External links

 

Melyridae